Bisara Mohanty was a devotee and historical figure of Jagannath culture, who rescued Daru Brahma (soul stuff) of Lord Jagannath from the river Ganga. He was a contemporary of King Ramachandra Deva I.

Bisara's story
There was a time when the Bengal Sultan's general Kalapahad invaded the Jagannath Temple of Puri and took the idol of Lord Jagannath to destroy it. When he tried to burn the idol, he found a part of the idol, called Daru Brahma, difficult to burn. He threw the remaining part into the river of Ganga. The Bisara Mohanty, who followed Kalapahad with the idol from Orissa to Bengal, floated down the stream and rescued the Daru Brahma. He put it inside a mridangam (drum) and secretly brought it to his village of Kujang.  There he had continued worshipping the Daru Brahma with simple offerings. The Ramachandra Deva, a new ruler, received a directive from Lord Jagannath in a dream. Laid claim to the remains and fabricated new idols of the god in which the Daru Brahma could reside. After the renovation of the Jagannath temple in Puri, king Ramachandra had placed the idols in the temple. He acknowledged Bisara Mohanty's role and conferred upon him the title Nayaka (chief) of the Purushottama Kshetra.

See also
 Nabakalebara

References 

Devotees of Jagannath
History of Odisha
People from Odisha